The College of Forestry (CFOR), Dapoli, established on 1 August 2005, is a constituent college of Dr. Balasaheb Sawant Konkan Krishi Vidyapeeth, located on the main campus in Dapoli, Ratnagiri district, Maharashtra.

Academics
Two academic programmes are available in CFOR. They are B.Sc. (Hons) Forestry and M.Sc. Forestry. 
Forestry Degree Programme was started in Dr. Balasaheb Sawant Kokan Krishi Vidyapeeth, Dapoli in the year 1985. The independent college was established in 2005. 1 August is celebrated as Foundation Day of CFOR, Dapoli. The M.Sc. Forestry was started in the year 2008. The syllabi taught in these programmes are adopted from ICAR's Deans' Committee's recommendations revised from time to time. Presently, the Vth Deans Committee syllabus is in vogue.

The number of students successfully awarded degrees includes: B.Sc. (Forestry) - 877  and M.Sc. (Forestry) – 55.

The curriculum at Bachelor's level seeks to develop a forester equipped with basic understanding of dynamics of forests through regeneration, growth and  extraction.  Disciplines  like  Silviculture and Agroforestry Forest Biology and Tree Improvement,  Forest Product Utilization, and  Natural resource Management form  the  core  of  this programme.  In addition, advanced  techniques  in tree breeding,  physiology, mensuration,  remote sensing, management, marketing, legislation, extension etc. are imparted through interactive learning through lecture and practical. The students are also imparted implant training for the entrepreneurship development in forestry sector and forest work experience. The entrepreneurship development modules include Production and Marketing of Quality Planting material, Cultivation and Processing of Medicinal Plants and Natural Resource Management (Ecotourism).

Accreditation 
Indian Council of Forestry Research and Education (ICFRE), Dehradun has accredited CFOR in A grade up to 2022. Similarly, Indian Council of Agricultural Research (ICAR), New Delhi has also accredited CFOR up to 2023. Both these agencies are supporting forestry education in CFOR by providing financial assistance to help develop and upgrade infrastructure and facilities.

Facilities and Infrastructure
The college has facilities for teaching undergraduate and post graduate degree programs, viz. Biodiversity Park on 50 ha, containing more than 150 plant species, Mist chamber and Nursery unit, which produces around 1 lakh seedlings of 50 tree species and several MAP species, Block Plantation of different timber tree species and multipurpose tree species, Bamboo museum having collection of 19 species, various Agroforestry Models suitable for the region, Charak Medicinal Plants Garden having 183 species, and Forest Products Processing Center which facilitates value addition of MAP and is approved by FAD department. Laboratory facilities with state of art instruments is available in the institute which includes Super Critical Analyzer, HPLC, Universal Wood Testing Machine, UV Spectrophotometer, Global Position System (GPS), Field and tracking equipments, Tree Canopy Analyzer, Portable Leaf area meter, Flame photometer. These instruments are being used by the faculty and students for conducting quality research work.

External links
 University website: http://www.dbskkv.org

Forestry education in India
Universities and colleges in Maharashtra
Ratnagiri district
Educational institutions established in 2005
2005 establishments in Maharashtra